The 6th International Qatar Cup was held in Doha, Qatar from 20 to 23 December 2019.

Medal overview

Men

Women

References

External links
Results

Qatar Cup
Qatar Cup
International weightlifting competitions hosted by Qatar
Qatar Cup
Sports competitions in Doha
21st century in Doha